Jake Gosling is an English music producer, songwriter, remixer, manager, and publisher best known for his work with artists such as Ed Sheeran, Lady Gaga, The Libertines, James Bay, Shawn Mendes, All Time Low, One Direction, Major Lazer, Christina Perri, Shania Twain, 5 Seconds of Summer, Paloma Faith, and Wiley.

He received the ASCAP award 2014 as a writer for hit song "Lego House" and was named Music Weeks Producer of 2012 after work on Sheeran's album +, as well as being the predominant producer on x (Multiply), Paloma Faith's Fall to Grace, and One Direction's Up All Night and Take Me Home, in which he produced Number 1 UK and worldwide hit single "Little Things". Gosling has remixed under the pseudonym Sketch Iz Dead for Lady Gaga, Timbaland & Nelly Furtado, Keane, Keri Hilson, and Far East Movement. Gosling runs his own recording studio Sticky Studios in Surrey.

Gosling and Sarah Liversedge run a joint venture publishing company called "The Movement London Limited". Gosling is signed as a songwriter to Concord Music Publishing and is a full member of the Music Producers Guild. He was nominated at the 58th Annual Grammy Awards for Record of the Year with "Thinking Out Loud". He has also won the Brit Award for 'Album of the Year' in 2015 with Sheeran's x. Gosling has been nominated twice at the Brit Awards for Producer of the Year. He was nominated at the 2015 Grammy Awards for Best Album with x.

In June 2015, "Thinking Out Loud" became the first single to spend a full year in the UK top 40. In September 2015, it also became the seventh single to have achieved triple Platinum in the UK during the 21st century. "Thinking Out Loud" was the first song to reach 500 million streams on Spotify and it is also one of the most streamed songs in the UK.

Gosling co-wrote the track "Incomplete" off the No.1 Selling album Chaos and the Calm (which went double Platinum in the UK) and the All Time Low track "Missing You" from the album Future Hearts which debuted at No.1 in the UK and co wrote the track "Home" for Birdy on the Album "Fire Within' which has gone Silver in the UK.

In 2016, Shawn Mendes' Album Illuminate was released, Gosling was a lead producer on this. He has also been working with Mario on his latest album 'Dancing Shadows' and is a featured artist and producer on the Major Lazer track 'Tied Up' which features Mr Eazi. RAYE and Jake Gosling.

Jake now focused on writing and producing with many different artists and running his record label 'Goldun Egg'. Jake is on the songwriter committee at BASCA, a full member of the Music Producers Guild and signed as songwriter to Concord Music Publishing exclusively. 

Currently Jake is working with key figures in the UK Drill scene on the producer and artist side from Central Cee to Tion Wayne and Ardee. Also working with producers such as Ghosty , Gotcha and 169.

Goldun Egg

Goldun Egg Records
Jake launched his own Record Label 'Goldun Egg Records' in 2017, with the ethos about driving forward their creativity and letting the artists be as creatively free as they can.

Signed to the roster are;
 NUUXS, [pronounced Nooks] is a half Laos, half French solo pop-noir artist that who was raised in Hackney, London. Her music has been described as 'Hypnotic and intoxicating' (Nylon) and 'So polished that it emits its own ultraviolet' (The Line of Best Fit). She has headlined the Sackler Space at The Roundhouse and played Bush Hall.
 Fergus, a singer-songwriter gifted with a beautiful voice who received his first radio play on Radio X, with recent single "Willow". Clash noted that "The newcomer's work gets under your skin, overpowering your emotions. FERGUS has developed a potent, highly individual style all his own".

Early career
Gosling started his music career performing as a lead vocalist and keys player in numerous bands, often engineering and producing the band's music, it was here he began to learn music production and modern recording techniques. After working in numerous jobs within the music industry, Gosling started his own recording studio; Sticky Studios, in Surrey, UK. Gosling's first mainstream success came in 2008 with the album See Clear Now by UK rapper Wiley, which reached number 18 in the UK charts. The album featured tracks "summertime", produced by Gosling, and "Cash in My Pocket", which he worked on with Mark Ronson. Gosling then worked with Southern Fried Records and produced/co-wrote tracks on the Crookers album Tons of Friends. He also performed vocals alongside Pitbull and Kardinal Offishall on tracks "Natural Born Hustler" and "Put Your Hands on Me".

Ed Sheeran

Gosling started working with a young Ed Sheeran in 2007, and they have gone on to form a successful partnership, both in writing and as a producer/artist team. In 2010, Gosling produced the Songs I Wrote with Amy EP, produced and co-wrote the Loose Change EP and The No. 5 Collaborations Project EP which featured rappers Wiley, Devlin, Sway DaSafo, Mikill Pane, JME, Ghetts, P Money, Dot Rotten, and Wretch 32. In 2014 Gosling produced Ed Sheeran single Make It Rain for the TV series Sons of Anarchy.

2011 saw the release of Sheeran's debut album +, for which Gosling co-wrote seven tracks and produced all but one of the tracks. + debuted at number 1 in the UK album charts with first week sales of 102,000 copies, first single "The A Team" was Grammy-nominated and peaked at number 3 in the Official UK charts, follow up single "You Need Me, I Don't Need You" peaked at number 4. The third single, "Lego House" (co-written by Sheeran, Gosling, and Leonard), achieved 5× Platinum status in the UK, selling over 600,000 copies and reaching number 5 in the UK singles chart. The fourth single, "Drunk", also featured in the top 10 By March 2014, + had been certified 6× Platinum indicating sales of over 1,800,000 records sold in the UK, as well as selling over 1,000,000 copies of single "The A Team". + received commercial and critical acclaim globally with it peaking at number 1 in multiple countries worldwide and number 5 in the US Billboard 200. The album has been certified 29 Gold and Platinum awards outside of the UK.

Gosling produced Ed Sheeran and Shady Records artist Yelawolf's collaboration The Slumdon Bridge EP. Gosling produced 7 tracks on Sheeran's second album x alongside other producers Rick Rubin and Pharrell Williams which was released in June 2014 and spent 8 weeks at number 1 in the UK, in its first week it charted at number 1 in 12 countries and has been certified double Platinum as well as being named the UK's biggest selling album of 2014.

One Direction

Gosling worked on One Direction's 2011 multi-Platinum selling, debut album Up All Night. He produced the track "Moments". The album was an international success, topping the charts in 16 countries. The album debuted at number 2 on the UK album chart and became the UK's fastest selling debut album of 2011. Up All Night went straight to number 1 on the United States Billboard 200, selling 176,000 copies in its first week, making One Direction the first British group in US chart history to achieve this feat with their debut album.

Gosling worked on the band's follow up album in 2012, titled Take Me Home. "Little Things", the second single from the album, was produced by Gosling and co-written by Ed Sheeran and Fiona Bevan, and it debuted at number 1 in the UK Official Singles Chart. Gosling also produced album track "Over Again". Take Me Home has been number 1 in over 20 countries and is certified as 3× Platinum in the UK, with "Little Things" being certified as Platinum in the US. Gosling also worked alongside Ryan Tedder on the track "Right Now", which appears on One Direction's third studio album Midnight Memories. Midnight Memories was the best selling artist album of 2013 with sales in excess of 685,000 for the year and is also certified as 2× Platinum in the UK and Platinum in the USA.

Paloma Faith
In 2012, Gosling worked with female solo artist Paloma Faith on her UK double Platinum selling album Fall to Grace, which peaked at number 2 in the UK Albums Chart in May 2012. Gosling collaborated with longtime friend and colleague Nellee Hooper, of Massive Attack fame, who has also produced world-wide stars such as U2 and Madonna. The album's lead single "Picking Up the Pieces" peaked at number 7 in the UK Singles Chart and was co-produced by Gosling. The follow up single "30 Minute Love Affair" was also co-produced by Gosling. The album became Faith's highest UK chart position to date.

Christina Perri
Gosling produced 9 of the 13 tracks on Christina Perri's second studio album Head or Heart, released in March 2014 on Atlantic Records. The album reached number 4 on the US Billboard 200 and number 8 on the official UK album charts. "Human", the lead single from the album, peaked at number 14 in the UK and number 31 in the US, where it was certified as gold.

The Libertines
In 2015, Gosling was asked to produce the comeback album Anthems for Doomed Youth for the British rock band The Libertines.  The album contains two notable literary references, the tracks "Anthem for Doomed Youth" and "Gunga Din" referencing poems of the same titles by Wilfred Owen and Rudyard Kipling respectively. "Gunga Din" was released as the album's first single on 2 July 2015. The album's second single, "Glasgow Coma Scale Blues", was released on 20 August 2015.<ref>The Libertines Share New Song "Glasgow Coma Scale Blues"' ', Pitchfork Media, 20 August 2015. Last accessed 20 August 2015.</ref> Both of which were produced by Gosling.

Reviews for the album were generally positive, earning a rating of 70 out of 100 on Metacritic, indicating generally favourable reviews.

Shawn Mendes
In 2016 Gosling started working on Shawn Mendes's second album, Illuminate

Gosling produced 9 tracks on the album, which went to number 1 on the US Billboard 200 with 145,000 equivalent album units, of which 121,000 copies were pure album sales.

Joe Levy, writing for Rolling Stone noted "Illuminate mixes professions of romantic agony like "Mercy" (where a quietly hummed hook explodes into crashing drums), with nice-boy valentines like "Treat You Better" and bedroom come ons like "Lights On. For Jon Reyes of Idolator, "[Shawn's] most noticeable change, aside from the tight music hall sonics, is the subtle infusion of sex into the lyrics. He's graduated from songs like "Kid in Love" to fare like "Lights On" and "Patience." Both ballads paint clear pictures of behind-closed-doors moments, and the sexual nature of the lyrics doesn't qualify as innuendo by any means."

Shania Twain 
After completing the Shawn Mendes album Illuminate, Gosling was asked to work with another Canadian artist, this time being Shania Twain on her fifth studio album, Now.
Now was released on 29 September 2017 by Mercury Nashville. It is Twain's first new studio album in 15 years, since her 2002 release, Up!.

Gosling produced 3 tracks on the main, including the promotional single "Poor Me". and a further track on the deluxe edition.

Now debuted at number one in the United Kingdom. It also entered at the top position in Australia, becoming her third album after Come on Over and Up! to reach the summit of the ARIA Albums Chart. In the United States, it additionally opened atop the Billboard 200 with 137,000 album-equivalent units, which included 134,000 album sales, and became her second number-one album in the country after Up!.

Charts
Number 1 Songs/Albums Jake has worked on:
•	One Direction – 'Up All Night'
•	Ed Sheeran – '+' Album 2011
•	One Direction – 'Take Me Home' 2012
•	One Direction – 'Little Things' 2012
•	Paloma Faith – 'Fall to Grace' 2012
•	Ed Sheeran – 'x' Album 2014
•	Ed Sheeran – 'Thinking Out Loud' Single 2014
In June 2015, "Thinking Out Loud" became the first single to spend a full year in the UK top 40
•	James Bay – 'Chaos and the Calm' Album 2015
•	Shawn Mendes - 'Illuminate' Album 2017
•	Shania Twain's - 'Now' Album 2017

Other Songs/Albums Jake has worked on:
•	Wiley (musician) – 'See Clear Now' 2008 
•	Ed Sheeran – 'Loose Change EP' 2010
•	Nina Nesbitt – 'The Apple Tree' 2012, 'Peroxide' 2014, 'Stay Out EP' 2013, 'Way in the World' 2013
•	Christina Perry – 'Head Or Heart' 2014
•	Birdy – 'Home' from the deluxe version of her album 'Fire Within' 2013
•	The Libertines – 'Anthem For Doomed Youth' 2015
•	Bobby Bazini – 'Blood's Thicker Than Water' 2016 (Which appeared on the hit TV show 'Suits')
•	Jeremy Loops – 'Critical As Water' 2018
•	Jeremy Loops – 'Gold' 2018
•	Major Lazer ft. Mr Eazi, RAYE, Jake Gosling – 'Tied Up' 2018
•	Mario – 'Dancing Shadows' 2018
•	Anteros – 'Fool Moon' 2019
•	Honeyblood – 'Glimmer' 2019
KSI - 'Holiday' 2021 - UK no 2 single 2021
• KSI ALBUM - UK No1 2021
•	 Bugzy Malone - 'Welcome to the Hood' 2021
• Digga D - Number 1 Album 'Noughty by Nature' 2022

Awards
Music Week's Producer of the year 2012
ASCAP Award - 'Lego House' 2014
Won - Brit Award for 'Album of the Year' – 'x' 2015
Nominated - 57th Annual Grammy Awards for Best Album of the Year - 'x' 2015
Nominated - 58th Annual Grammy Awards for Record of the Year – 'Thinking Out Loud' 2016
Nominated twice for Brit Awards' Producer of the Year

Other projects
Gosling has worked with Scottish singer-songwriter Nina Nesbitt. He produced Nina's 2012 The Apple Tree EP and co-wrote the lead single, "The Apple Tree". Gosling produced Nesbitt's debut album, which was released in February 2014 and peaked at number 11 in the UK Album Chart and number 1 in Nesbitt's native Scottish album chart.

Gosling co-produced Mikill Pane debut album Blame Miss Barclay, released in 2013. Gosling co-wrote the second single, "Nothing Really Matters", from Mr Probz's new album 2015 with writers Akon, Dennis Princewall Stehr, and Giorgio Tuinfort. Gosling has also produced and co-written on Taylor Berrett's debut album, who is signed to Warner Bros. Records in the US.

Gosling teamed up with Irish group the Original Rudeboys to produce and co-write their 2012 album This Life, which reached number 3 in the Irish Official Music Chart and has been certified as Platinum. Gosling has also worked on, as they are now known, O.R.B.'s second album, All We Are, which was released in March 2014 and reached number 2 in the Irish Charts.

Gosling has also ventured into the world of film, co-writing with composer Ruth Barrett the score for the UK urban film Twenty8k, which was released in October 2012.

For the UK charity National Citizen Service, Gosling produced a cover of the Beatles' "Come Together" with a selection of the UK's new artists, which included Nina Nesbitt, Will Heard, Lewis Watson, Kimberly Anne, Chasing Grace, Olivia Sebastianelli, and Colour The Atlas.

In addition to songwriting and production, Gosling ran a new music night called Nobu Unplugged, an evening he organised with John Woolf to showcase up and coming artists. It was held at the Michelin star restaurant Nobu Berkeley St in London on the last Sunday of every month, and it featured the likes of Ed Sheeran, Nina Nesbitt, Laura Mvula, Jamie N Commons, Tori Kelly, Jacob Banks, and Rixton, amongst others. The night received critical acclaim from The Sunday Times, Culture Magazine, and Tatler Magazine.

Gosling runs a management company Sticky Management alongside Adam Coltman.

Discography

References

Living people
English songwriters
English record producers
Musicians from Surrey
Year of birth missing (living people)